Justice Orr may refer to:

 Alan Stewart Orr, British Lord Justice, called Mr Justice Orr in the High Court
 Robert F. Orr, associate justice of the North Carolina Supreme Court
 Warren H. Orr, chief justice of the Illinois Supreme Court
 William Edwin Orr, associate justice of the Nevada Supreme Court

See also
 Judge Orr (disambiguation)